Steinar Hansson (31 May 1947 – 3 August 2004) was a Norwegian journalist and publisher. He was born in Asker. He worked as editor in the publishing house Pax Forlag, and edited the newspaper Ny Tid from 1979. From 1983 he worked for the publishing house J.W. Cappelens Forlag. He was cultural editor for the newspaper Arbeiderbladet, and later for Dagbladet. He was chief editor of Arbeiderbladet (renamed to  Dagsavisen in 1997) from 1995 to 2001

He was awarded The Great Journalist Prize in 1999.

Books 
Operasjon Libanon. En reportasjebok om Israels okkupasjon av Sør-Libanon, 1978
Sosialisme på norsk. (Editor together with Rune Slagstad), 1981
Makt og mannefall. Historien om Gro Harlem Brundtland, (with Ingolf Håkon Teigene), 1992
Fordømte forfattere og andre essays, 1994
Johan Jørgen Holst, 1994

References

1947 births
2004 deaths
People from Asker
Norwegian publishers (people)
Norwegian newspaper editors
Norwegian non-fiction writers
Dagsavisen editors